is a Japanese football player. He plays for Nara Club.

Club statistics

References

External links

Profile at Nara Club
j-league

1986 births
Living people
University of Tsukuba alumni
Association football people from Ibaraki Prefecture
Japanese footballers
J2 League players
Japan Football League players
FC Gifu players
Nara Club players
Association football defenders